The 2012 Australian Open was a tennis tournament that took place in Melbourne Park in Melbourne, Australia, from 16 to 29 January 2012. It was the 100th edition of the Australian Open, and the first Grand Slam event of the year. The tournament consisted of events for professional players in singles, doubles and mixed doubles play. Junior and wheelchair players competed in singles and doubles tournaments.

Novak Djokovic successfully defended his title after he defeated Rafael Nadal in the longest grand slam final in history. The 2012 final passed the 2008 Wimbledon final for the record, finishing after 5 hours and 53 minutes of play. Kim Clijsters was the defending champion for the women's singles, but lost to Victoria Azarenka in the semifinals. Azarenka defeated Maria Sharapova for her first Grand Slam title; and over took Caroline Wozniacki as the number one ranked player on the WTA Tour. In the doubles Leander Paes and Radek Štěpánek won the title. Paes completed a career Grand Slam with the title while Štěpánek won his first Slam. On the women's side an all Russian duo of Svetlana Kuznetsova and Vera Zvonareva took the title. The mixed event was won by Bethanie Mattek-Sands and Horia Tecău.

Tournament
The 2012 Australian Open took place in January 2012 at Melbourne Park. The men's singles was staged for the 100th time. There have been 59 different previous winners and the 100th staging of the event was marked by a special coin and the 2012 Champion received a special medallion. The tournament also marked 50 years since Rod Laver won his first Grand Slam. For the first time Hawk-Eye ball tracking system was used on the Margaret Court Arena, while Ken Fletcher was inducted into the Australian Tennis Hall of Fame.

Points and prize money

Point distribution
Below is a series of tables for each of the competitions showing the ranking points on offer for each event.

Seniors points

Junior points

Wheelchair points

Prize money
The 2012 Australian Open was the richest Grand Slam tournament in history, with the singles champions pocketing 2.3 million dollars. All prize money is in Australian dollars (AUD); doubles prize money is distributed per pair.

Men's and women's singles
Winners: $2,300,000
Runners-up: $1,150,000
Semi-finalists: $437,000
Quarter-finalists: $218,500
Fourth round: $109,250
Third round: $54,625
Second round: $33,300
First round: $20,000

Men's and women's doubles
Winners: $454,500
Runners-up: $227,250
Semi-finalists: $113,000
Quarter-finalists: $56,000
Third round: $31,500
Second round: $17,200
First round: $9,600

Mixed doubles
 Winners: $135,500
 Runners-up: $67,500
 Semi-finalists: $33,900
 Quarter-finalists: $15,500
 Second round: $7,800
 First round: $3,800

Day-by-day summaries

Events

Seniors

Men's singles 

Novak Djokovic was the defending champion and won in the final 5–7, 6–4, 6–2, 6–7(5–7), 7–5 against Rafael Nadal entering the season as reigning world number 1 for the first time of his career. It was the longest match in the history of the Australian Open, and in fact, the longest ever singles final in the Open Era in Grand Slam history; clocked at 5 hours and 53 minutes and ending after midnight with Nadal memorable saying after the match "good morning." It marked the fifth Grand Slam of Djokovic's career and his 3rd Australian Open. It also marked the first time that he had defended a Grand Slam title. After winning the 2012 Australian Open, Djokovic had an opportunity to become the first man since Rod Laver in 1969 to hold all four Grand Slams at the same time, after winning the previous two in 2011. Nadal became the first player to lose in the final of three consecutive Grand Slams in the Open Era.

Championship match result
 Novak Djokovic defeated  Rafael Nadal, 5–7, 6–4, 6–2, 6–7(5–7), 7–5

Women's singles 

Victoria Azarenka won her first Grand Slam title, becoming the first Belarusian player to win a Grand Slam in singles, by defeating Maria Sharapova in the final. She also became the 21st player to be ranked World No. 1 by the Women's Tennis Association on 30 January 2012 as a result of this win. It was Azarenka's 2nd title of the year and 10th of her career.

Championship match result
 Victoria Azarenka defeated  Maria Sharapova, 6–3, 6–0

Men's doubles 

 Leander Paes /  Radek Štěpánek defeated  Bob Bryan /  Mike Bryan, 7–6(7–1), 6–2

Women's doubles 

 Svetlana Kuznetsova /  Vera Zvonareva defeated  Sara Errani /  Roberta Vinci, 5–7, 6–4, 6–3

Mixed doubles 

 Bethanie Mattek-Sands /  Horia Tecău defeated  Elena Vesnina /  Leander Paes, 6–3, 5–7, [10–3]

Juniors

Boys' singles 

 Luke Saville defeated  Filip Peliwo, 6–3, 5–7, 6–4

Girls' singles 

 Taylor Townsend defeated  Yulia Putintseva, 6–1, 3–6, 6–3

Boys' doubles 

 Liam Broady /  Joshua Ward-Hibbert defeated  Adam Pavlásek /  Filip Veger, 6–3, 6–2

Girls' doubles 

 Gabrielle Andrews /  Taylor Townsend defeated  Irina Khromacheva /  Danka Kovinić, 5–7, 7–5, [10–6]

Other events

Wheelchair men's singles 

 Maikel Scheffers defeated  Nicolas Peifer, 3–6, 7–6(7–2), 6–0

Wheelchair women's singles 

 Esther Vergeer defeated  Aniek van Koot, 6–0, 6–0

Wheelchair quad singles 

 Peter Norfolk defeated  David Wagner, 4–6, 6–4, 6–2

Wheelchair men's doubles 

 Ronald Vink /  Robin Ammerlaan defeated  Stéphane Houdet /  Nicolas Peifer, 6–2, 4–6, 6–1

Wheelchair women's doubles 

 Esther Vergeer /  Sharon Walraven defeated   Aniek van Koot /  Marjolein Buis, 4–6, 6–2, 6–4

Wheelchair quad doubles 

 Andrew Lapthorne /  Peter Norfolk defeated  David Wagner /  Noam Gershony, 6–4, 6–2

Broadcast 

The host broadcaster of the event was the Seven Network which ran all day and night coverage on its primary channel and its digital channel 7Two from 11 am until the close of play around midnight Melbourne time. 2012 is the first year Seven has aired live primetime play across the entire country, switching coverage to 7Two for various live news and Today Tonight broadcasts in different time zones of Australia. Associated media partnership Yahoo!7 (co-owned by Seven and Yahoo!) saw more than 100 000 viewers check into live match coverage via the Fango mobile app, with check-ins peaking during the Hewitt vs. Djokovic match in the Open's fourth round.

The event was also shown in Australia on Fox Sports which broadcast secondary matches live.

Players

Seniors

Singles seeds

Seeds and Rankings are as of 9 January 2012 and Points are as of 16 January 2012.

Men's singles

Withdrawn players (men's singles)

Women's singles

Withdrawn players (women's singles)

Main draw wildcard entries

Men's singles
  Kenny de Schepper
  James Duckworth
  Lleyton Hewitt
  Marinko Matosevic
  Benjamin Mitchell
  Greg Jones
  Tatsuma Ito
  Jesse Levine

Women's singles
  Ashleigh Barty
  Casey Dellacqua
  Olivia Rogowska
  Isabella Holland
  Bojana Bobusic
  Madison Keys
  Aravane Rezaï
  Zhang Shuai

Men's doubles
  James Duckworth /  Adam Feeney
  Matthew Ebden /  Chris Guccione
  Colin Ebelthite /  Marinko Matosevic
  Lleyton Hewitt /  Peter Luczak
  Greg Jones /  John-Patrick Smith
  Benjamin Mitchell /  Matt Reid
  Luke Saville /  Andrew Whittington

Women's doubles
  Monique Adamczak /  Olivia Rogowska
  Ashleigh Barty /  Laura Robson
  Stephanie Bengson /  Tyra Calderwood
  Daniella Jeflea /  Viktorija Rajicic
  Sacha Jones /  Bojana Bobusic
  Tammi Patterson /  Storm Sanders
  Sally Peers /  Isabella Holland

Mixed doubles
  Ashleigh Barty /  Benjamin Mitchell
  Kimiko Date-Krumm /  Kei Nishikori
  Casey Dellacqua /  Matthew Ebden
  Jelena Dokić /  Paul Hanley
  Jarmila Gajdošová /  Bruno Soares
  Jelena Janković /  Bernard Tomic
  Olivia Rogowska /  Marinko Matosevic

Protected ranking

Men's singles
  Benjamin Becker
  Tommy Haas

Women's singles
  Anna Chakvetadze

Qualifying entries

Men's singles

  Florent Serra
  Peter Gojowczyk
  Danai Udomchoke
  Andrey Golubev
  James Ward
  Jesse Huta Galung
  Lukáš Lacko
  Denis Kudla
  Jürgen Zopp
  Matteo Viola
  Alexander Kudryavtsev
  Roberto Bautista Agut
  Frederik Nielsen
  Alex Kuznetsov
  Björn Phau
  Illya Marchenko

The following players received as a lucky loser:
  Rik de Voest

Women's singles

 Laura Robson
 Irena Pavlovic
 Andrea Hlaváčková
 Stefanie Vögele
 Alison Riske
 Maria João Köhler
 Paula Ormaechea
 Nina Bratchikova
 Valeria Savinykh
 Chang Kai-chen
 Varvara Lepchenko
 Jamie Hampton

Withdrawals
The following players were accepted directly into the main tournament, but withdrew with injuries.

Men's singles

Women's singles

Juniors
Below is a list of the sixteen seeds for the boys and girls singles and the eight qualifiers for each event.

Singles seeds

Boys' singles

Girls' singles

Wheelchair tennis
The field consisted of top seven ranked players in the men's and women's singles, the three top three ranked players in the quad singles category and one wildcard was chosen for each draw.

Singles seeds

Men's singles

 Maikel Scheffers (1)
 Stéphane Houdet (2)

Women

 Esther Vergeer (1)
 Aniek van Koot (2)

Quad
 David Wagner (1)
 Peter Norfolk (2)

References

External links